Mordellistena bevisi is a beetle in the genus Mordellistena of the family Mordellidae. It was described in 1956 by Franciscolo.

References

bevisi
Beetles described in 1956